Kross is a surname. It is an occupational surname for a maker of ceramic kitchenware, metonymically derived from Middle Low German krus, kros ‘pitcher’, ‘ceramic drinking vessel’. Variants: Kröss, Kress. It is also an Estonian spelling of the surname Gross.

Notable people with the surname include:

David Kross (born 1990), German actor
Eerik-Niiles Kross (born 1967), Estonian diplomat, politician and security advisor
Jaan Kross (1920–2007), Estonian writer
Märten Kross (born 1970), Estoninan musician, artist, writer
Kärt Kross (born 1968), Estonian actress
Kayden Kross (born 1985), American pornographic actress
Killer Kross (born 1985), American professional wrestler

References

Estonian-language surnames
German-language surnames
Occupational surnames